Hedong Station, formerly Baihedong Station during planning, is a station on Guangfo Line. It is located under Hedong Road in Fangcun, Liwan District, Guangzhou. It entered operation on December 28, 2015.

Station layout

Exits

References

Guangzhou Metro stations in Liwan District
Foshan Metro stations
Railway stations in China opened in 2015